The 1995 European motorcycle Grand Prix was the last round of the 1995 Grand Prix motorcycle racing season. It took place on 8 October 1995 at the Circuit de Catalunya.

500 cc classification

250 cc classification

125 cc classification

References

European motorcycle Grand Prix
European
European Motorcycle